Summa Ri (also known as Summa Ri I & II) comprises two of the sub-peaks of Skil Brum in the Hindu Kush-Karakoram range. It is on the border between Gilgit-Baltistan region of Pakistan-administered Kashmir and Xinjiang Autonomous Region in the China.

Location

The summit is located 2.39 km northeast of the Skil Brum. The Savoy Glacier flows from the eastern flank of the mountain in an easterly direction to the Godwin-Austen Glacier. (Coordinates: 35° 51' 52'' N, 76° 27' 2'' E) 

This peak is located at the west of Summa Ri I. (Coordinates: 35° 51' 41'' N, 76° 26' 18'' E)

Both Summa Ri I & II are considered to be one of the highest unclimbed peaks.

References 

Mountains of Gilgit-Baltistan
Mountains of the Hindu Kush